Syntaxin-2, also known as epimorphin, is a protein that in humans is encoded by the STX2 gene.

The product of this gene belongs to the syntaxin/epimorphin family of proteins. The syntaxins are a large protein family implicated in the targeting and fusion of intracellular transport vesicles. The product of this gene regulates epithelial-mesenchymal interactions and epithelial cell morphogenesis and activation. Alternatively spliced transcript variants encoding different isoforms have been identified. When the N terminus is on the cytosolic face it acts as a t-SNARE involved in intracellular vesicle docking and is called  Syntaxin-2. When flipped inside out, i.e. N terminus hangs out on the extracellular surface (by some nonclassical secretion pathway) it acts as a versatile morphogen and is called epimorphin. This membrane protein enjoys the double choice of another form of topological alternatives of being targeted to either apical or basolateral surface of an epithelial cell in a regulated way depending on various contexts. When expressed by mesenchymal cells it can instruct epithelial morphogenesis at epithelial mesenchymal interfaces.

Interactions 

STX2 has been shown to interact with SNAP-25, SNAP23, STXBP1 and Syntaxin binding protein 3.

References

Further reading